Wasna Ahmed is an Indian television actress. She made her debut with the role of Dhara in Kasautii Zindagii Kay. She also played titular character in Shree.

Filmography

Films
2013 Kadhal Solla Aasai (Tamil) as Suchitra
2015 Palaandu Vaazhga
Television
Kasautii Zindagii Kay as Dhara
Kahe Naa Kahe as Kinjal (opposite Karan Hukku)
Shree as Shree
Kabhi Kabhii Pyaar Kabhi Kabhii Yaar as herself
Dance India Dance as herself
Aahat as Rani
C.I.D. (Indian TV series) as Kashish
Phulwa as Mahua

Awards
2007 Indian Telly Awards Nominated for Best Fresh New Face.

References

Living people
Year of birth missing (living people)
Indian television actresses
21st-century Indian actresses
Actresses from Kolkata